Christian Gonzalez (born June 28, 2002) is an American football cornerback for the Oregon Ducks. He played for the Colorado Buffaloes before playing one season with Oregon in 2022, where he received all-conference honors. He is the younger brother of Colombian-American hurdler Melissa Gonzalez.

Early life
Gonzalez was born on June 28, 2002, in Carrollton, Texas, and grew up in The Colony, Texas. He attended The Colony High School, where he was rated a four-star prospect as a cornerback and wide receiver. Gonzalez initially committed to play college football at Purdue University before enrolling at the University of Colorado.

College career
Gonzalez would become at fulltime cornerback upon joining the Colorado Buffaloes football team in 2020 and started every game as a freshman, making 25 tackles with five pass deflections. As a sophomore, he had 53 tackles, 5.5 tackles for loss, and five passes broken up. 

Gonzalez transferred to the University of Oregon in 2022 to play for the Oregon Ducks. He was named first-team All-Pac-12 after recording 45 tackles, 7 pass breakups, and 3 interceptions. He declared for the 2023 NFL Draft following the season.

Personal life
Gonzalez was born to an athletic Colombian family. His father, Hector, is 6-foot-9 and played college basketball at the University of Texas at El Paso before playing semiprofessionally in Colombia. He has three sisters, Melissa, Samantha, and Lily. Melissa (University of Texas) and Samantha (University of Miami) were two-time All-Americans in track and field and represent Colombia in international events. Gonzalez is the brother-in-law of NFL quarterback David Blough through marriage to Melissa.

References

External links

Oregon Ducks bio
Colorado Buffaloes bio

2002 births
Living people
Players of American football from Texas
American football cornerbacks
American sportspeople of Colombian descent
Colorado Buffaloes football players
Oregon Ducks football players
People from Carrollton, Texas
People from The Colony, Texas